Tahitipresse was the online press agency of the Agence Tahitienne de Presse (ATP), also known as the Tahiti Press Agency. The bilingual news agency, which published in both French and English, was headquartered in Tahiti and covered the news and current events of French Polynesia.

TahitiPresse.com was shut down on 31 December 2011. A similar site – FenuaNews.com – has been opened.

References

External links
Fenua News

News agencies based in French Polynesia
French Polynesian news websites
Publications established in 2001
Publications disestablished in 2011